Spyridon "Spyros" Papathanasiou (born 12 February 1992, in Thessaloniki) is a Greek footballer who plays for Iraklis in the Greek Football League, as a goalkeeper. He has also played football for PAOK, Visaltiakos, Kavala and Ethnikos Gazoros. Papathanasiou has played international football with Greece U17.

Career

Club career
Papathanasiou started his football in the youth teams of PAOK. PAOK loaned him to Visaltiakos. After leaving PAOK in 2010 he signed for Kavala. In 2011, he moved to Ethnikos Gazoros. In his three seasons with the club he appeared in 11 matches. On 29 July 2014 he signed a two-year contract with Greek Football League club Iraklis.

International career
Papathanasiou has gained 8 caps for Greece U17.

References

External links
Myplayer.gr profile

1992 births
Living people
Iraklis Thessaloniki F.C. players
Kavala F.C. players
PAOK FC players
Greek footballers
Association football goalkeepers
Footballers from Thessaloniki